Gerhard Max Richard Bienert (8 January 1898 – 23 December 1986) was a German stage and film actor.

Gerhard Bienert was born in Berlin, Germany and died in the same city in 1986 at age 88.

Selected filmography

 Duke Ferrante's End (1922)
 Man by the Wayside (1923)
 The Man with the Frog (1929)
 Mother Krause's Journey to Happiness (1929) - Untermieter
 Ludwig II, King of Bavaria (1930) - Hesselschwerdt
 The Blue Angel (1930) - Polizist / Policeman
 Her Majesty the Barmaid (1931) - Werkmeister
 The Man in Search of His Murderer (1931) - Policeman
 Feind im Blut (1931) - Mechaniker
 Inquest (1931) - Baumann, Kriminalkommissar
 M (1931) - Criminal Secretary
 Checkmate (1931) - 2. Kommissar
 Panik in Chicago (1931) - Tom
 The Battle of Bademunde (1931) - Feldwebel
 Berlin-Alexanderplatz (1931) - Klempner-Karl
 Peace of Mind (1931) - Unteroffizier Krause
 Kameradschaft (1931) - Deutscher Gendarm
 The Captain from Köpenick (1931) - Gardegrenadier
 Yorck (1931)
 The Pride of Company Three (1932) - Sergeant Schmidt
 Things Are Getting Better Already (1932) - Polizist
 Rasputin, Demon with Women (1932)
 Five from the Jazz Band (1932)
 Crime Reporter Holm (1932)
 Kuhle Wampe (1932) - Zeitungsleser in der S-Bahn
 Man Without a Name (1932)
 Unheimliche Geschichten (1932) - Kriminalkommissar
 The Heath Is Green (1932)
 The First Right of the Child (1932)
 I by Day, You by Night (1932) - Polizist
 The Testament of Dr. Mabuse (1933)
 Morgenrot (1933) - Seaman Böhm
 Ich will Dich Liebe lehren (1933)
 Jumping Into the Abyss (1933) - Walter Volkmann
 Ihre Durchlaucht, die Verkäuferin (1933) - Der Kontrolleur
 Inge and the Millions (1933) - Arbeiter
 Police Report (1934) - Ihr Mann, ein Arbeiter
 My Heart Calls You (1934)
 Ein Mann will nach Deutschland (1934)
 Hard Luck Mary (1934) - Kagel
 Herr Kobin geht auf Abenteuer (1934) - Der fremde Herr
 Decoy (1934) - 1. Offizier an Bord der 'Adrian Termeer'
 The Two Seals (1934) - Friese
 Oberwachtmeister Schwenke (1935)
 Everything for a Woman (1935) - Tim, ein verkrachter Artist
 Amphitryon (1935)
 A Pair of Lovers (1935) - Schnaars, Gutsverwalter
 Hangmen, Women and Soldiers (1935) - Kossmann
 Trouble Backstairs (1935) - Bäckermeister Gustav Kluge
 Black Roses (1935) - Niklander
 Fährmann Maria (1936) - The Wealthy Landowner
 Die große und die kleine Welt (1936) - Werner - Schusters Freund
 The Beggar Student (1936) - Kinsky, Tierbudenbesitzer
 City of Anatol (1936) - Arbeiter bei Ölbohrungen
 Annemarie. Die Geschichte einer jungen Liebe (1936) - Feldwebel
 Dahinten in der Heide (1936) - Pohl, Gendarm
 Thunder, Lightning and Sunshine (1936) - Ingenieur Poppe
 The Man Who is Talked About (1937) - Dompteur Carasso
 Krach und Glück um Künnemann (1937) - Paul Lindner - Magistratsbeamter
 Gewitterflug zu Claudia (1937) - Huebner, Bordmechaniker
 The Indian Tomb (1938) - Ratani, Werkmeister
 The Marriage Swindler (1938) - Assistent Obermeier
 Musketier Meier III (1938) - Feldwebel Nagel
 Mordsache Holm (1938) - Krim.Assistent bei Sartorius
 Das Leben kann so schön sein (1938) - Dietrich, Noras Abteilungsleiter
 Pour le Mérite (1938) - Gefängnis-Wachhabender
  (1938, released 1947) - Paul Schlieker
 Aufruhr in Damaskus (1939) - Feldwebel Lemcke
 Parkstrasse 13 (1939) - Kommissar Warnke
 Escape in the Dark (1939) - Lagerverwalter Müller
 Gold in New Frisco (1939) - Ferguson
 The Desert Song (1939) - Hafenbeamter
 Der letzte Appell (1939)
 Rote Mühle (1940)
 Was wird hier gespielt? (1940)
 The Girl from Barnhelm (1940)
 The Girl from Fano (1941) - Hinnerk
 Alarm (1941) - Kriminalkommissar Dr. Dittmann
 Uncle Kruger (1941) - Scottish Officer Brown
 Krach im Vorderhaus (1941) - (uncredited)
 Her Other Self (1941) - 1. Arbeiter
 I Entrust My Wife to You (1943) - Verkehrspolizist
 Shiva und die Galgenblume (1945)
 Leuchtende Schatten (1945)
 Die Schenke zur ewigen Liebe (1945)
 Peter Voss, Thief of Millions (1946) - Taxichauffeur (uncredited)
 Blue Affair (1948) - Karl Bremer
 Night of the Twelve (1949)
 Die Kreuzlschreiber (1950) - Bit Part (uncredited)
 Mein Herz darfst du nicht fragen (1952) - Wachtmeister (uncredited)
 Die Unbesiegbaren (1953) - Wachtmeister Vogt
 Ernst Thälmann (1954) - Otto Kramer
 Ein Polterabend (1955) - Rentier Buffy
 Before God and Man (1955)
 Thomas Müntzer (1956) - Count Ernst von Mansfeld
 Die Millionen der Yvette (1956) - Bleichstetter, Bankier
 Lissy (1957) - Vater Schröder
 Polonia-Express (1957) - Wilhelm Merkel
 Die Schönste (1957) - Gustav Wille
 Les Misérables (1958) - Le président du tribunal
 Emilia Galotti (1958) - Odoardo Galotti
 Ein Mädchen von 16 ½ (1958) - Oskar Genz
 Der Prozeß wird vertagt (1958) - Gefängnisdirektor
 Klotz am Bein (1958) - Vater Weber
 Reportage 57 (1959) - Vater Kramer
 Love's Confusion (1959) - 1. Taxichauffeur
 The Opportunists (1960) - Jean-Jacques Rouget
 Alwin der Letzte (1960) - Alwin Schmieder
 Die heute über 40 sind (1960) - Herr Weidtlich
 Mutter Courage und ihre Kinder (1960) - Feldwebel
 Viel Lärm um nichts (1964) - Holzapfel
 Ohne Paß in fremden Betten (1965) - Wilhelm Kabuffke
 Hochzeitsnacht im Regen (1967) - Master of Provisions
 Wir lassen uns scheiden (1968) - Opa Koch
 Effi Briest (1970, TV Movie) - Vater Briest
 Die Elixiere des Teufels (1973) - Prior Leonard
 Der nackte Mann auf dem Sportplatz (1974) - Wilhelm
 Suse, liebe Suse (1975) - Herms
 Flowers for the Man in the Moon (1975) - Opa Sielaff
 Hostess (1976) - Rentner Heinrich
 Die Leiden des jungen Werthers (1976) - Pfarrer
 Die Flucht (1977) -Schmidts Vater
 Sabine Wulff (1978) - Onkel Karl
 Fleur Lafontaine (1978) - Opa Schnedderich
 Groß und Klein (1980) - Alter / Assistent

Bibliography
 Kosta, Barbara. Willing Seduction: The Blue Angel, Marlene Dietrich, and Mass Culture. Berghahn Books, 2009

External links

1898 births
1986 deaths
German male film actors
German male silent film actors
German male television actors
Male actors from Berlin
20th-century German male actors
Burials at the Waldfriedhof Zehlendorf